This is a list of the members of the Iceland Althing (Parliament) from 1999 till 2003.

Election results

List of MPs elected on 18 May 1999

Notes

1999